Circomphalus foliaceolamellosus is a species of saltwater clam, a marine bivalve mollusc in the family Veneridae, the venus clams.

<div align=center>
Right and left valve of the same specimen:

</div align=center>

Fossil records
The genus Circomphalus is known from the Miocene to the Recent periods (age range: from 15.97 to 0.0 million years ago).

Description

Distribution
This species can be found on the coasts of Senegal and surroundings.

References

External links
 Animalbase
 Encyclopedia of life

Veneridae
Bivalves described in 1817